Mark David Thomas (born 1 March 1967) is a British former newspaper editor who now works in public relations.

Thomas grew up in south London, where he attended Rutlish School, Merton Park.  He entered journalism in 1988, as a reporter for The People. In 1994, he moved to the News of the World, where he rose to become a chief reporter. 

He joined the Daily Mirror in 1997 as features editor, then became assistant editor and, in 2001, deputy editor. In 2003, he was appointed editor of The People, and remained in the post until 2008. He then took up an appointment at TM Media PR.

He currently works as director of marketing & fundraising at the Hospital of St John and St Elizabeth, 60 Grove End Road, St John's Wood, London NW8.

References

1967 births
British newspaper editors
Living people
People educated at Rutlish School
The Sunday People people
News of the World people
Daily Mirror people